Ken Burns Jazz: John Coltrane is a compilation album by jazz musician John Coltrane. It is part of a series of tie-in compilations from various labels to the PBS miniseries Ken Burns Jazz.

Track listing
 "’Round Midnight" (Cootie Williams; Thelonious Monk; Bernie Hanighen) – 5:58
 "Mr. P.C." (John Coltrane) – 7:00
 "Naima" (John Coltrane) – 4:23
 "My Favorite Things" (Richard Rodgers; Oscar Hammerstein II) – 13:44
 "Chasing the Trane" (John Coltrane) – 16:04
 "In a Sentimental Mood" (Irving Mills; Duke Ellington; Manny Kurtz) – 4:16
 "Afro Blue" (Mongo Santamaria) – 8:09
 "Alabama" (John Coltrane) – 5:11
 "A Love Supreme: Part I: Acknowledgement" (John Coltrane) – 7:48
 "Jupiter" (John Coltrane) – 5:22

References

External links
 

Compilation albums published posthumously
John Coltrane compilation albums
2000 compilation albums
Verve Records compilation albums